The Bybrook, also known as the By Brook, is a small river in England. Its sources are the Burton Brook and the Broadmead Brook, which rise in South Gloucestershire at Tormarton and Cold Ashton respectively, and join just north of Castle Combe in Wiltshire. A variety of flora and fauna is supported by the river including the endangered white-clawed crayfish. Twenty watermill sites have been identified on the river but none now remain in use.

Course
The Burton Brook rises near Lower Lapdown Farm at Tormarton and runs in an easterly direction towards the village of Burton on the Gloucestershire-Wiltshire border. The Broadmead Brook rises at Folly Farm at Cold Ashton and runs eastwards south of the Burton Brook; the two join below Gatcombe Hill, just north of the Wiltshire village of Castle Combe, at the beginning of a steep valley.

The Bybrook now flows southwards towards the village of Ford. Just before the village, the Danscombe Brook and another unnamed tributary join on the right bank from North Wraxall and Colerne Airfield. On through Slaughterford and turning southwards, the Bybrook is joined on the right bank by the Lid Brook at Drewett's Mill, north of Box; locally, the Bybrook is more commonly referred to as the Weavern downstream of Weavern Farm. The stream now runs in a southwesterly direction through a shallower valley, past Shockerwick House, before joining the Bristol Avon at Bathford, at a point adjacent to the main railway line from London and the A4 road.

Mills
There is evidence of at least 20 mill sites along the Bybrook; many were seasonal and only operated when there was sufficient water. In Roman times, the mills were exclusively used for grinding corn, but by the end of the 12th century, this part of Wiltshire became an important centre for the wool trade. Mills were converted to the cleansing and thickening of wool, a process known as fulling.

Fulling mills were established by Sir John Fastolf in Castle Combe, along the Bybrook, in the thirteenth and fourteenth centuries, supporting a thriving woollen industry.

With the decline of the woollen industry in the 17th century, accelerated by the Civil War and plague, many mills returned to grain, and fulling finally ceased when steam power shifted cloth-making to the north in the Industrial Revolution. The rise in demand for paper for packaging from nearby Bristol led to many mills converting to paper making in the 18th and 19th centuries.

No mills remain in use. Chapps Mill paper mill, which is associated with Slaughterford although it is in Colerne parish, continued in production until the 1990s.

Named mills 

Goulters Mill, also known as Littleton Mill (1773) was a corn mill mentioned in the Domesday Book.

Gatcombe Mill, also known as Gadcombe Mill, was of greater significance than Goulters Mill. It was known to be a corn mill in 1887 and continued in use until the 1920s. There is no evidence of use other than to grind corn, but the proximity to Castle Combe raises the possibility of earlier cloth industry unless water was insufficient.

Tanners Mill, also known as Old Mill (1887), which dates back to at least 1773, is now incorporated in the buildings of Lower Shirehill Farm. Due to inadequacy of water supply, this must have been a seasonal corn mill.

West Kington Mill. Its size and age seem to be similar to Gatcombe Mill. In 1887 it was a corn mill that also housed a shoemaker and a butcher's shop.

Wick Mill, also known as Longs or Langs Mill and Hennars Mill. This was derelict by 1887. In 1704, three mills in the parish of North Wraxall paid tithes: Doncombe Mill 4s, Ford Mill 3s 4d and Hennars Mill 4s. A cloth mill in 1802, by 1829 it became a grist mill.

Nettleton Mill is part of the Castle Combe estate. The buildings date from the 18th century. A grist mill, its undershot wheel was replaced by a turbine during the 19th century. In the 1950s and 60s, the turbine power was utilised at some time, probably when the stream flow became inadequate.

Castle Combe Mill. The stepping stone weir and sluice are all that remain, in the gardens of the Manor House Hotel.

Upper Colham Mill. A barn on the old mill site is reported to have been a weaving shed. A turbine was in use in the 20th century for a sawmill on the opposite bank from the mill.

Lower Colham Mill declined in importance with the demise of the wool trade. Racks of cloth would have been taken across the bank from both Colham Mills to dry on the significantly named Rack Hill, now a nature reserve.

Upper Long Dean Mill is reported to have been a blanket mill prior to the First World War, It was then a flour mill, and changed to a grist mill until it ceased operation in 1956. Its undershot wheel is still in place and the rooms inside its mansard roof show evidence of the weavers who used to work there.

Lower Long Dean Mill was built as a paper mill by a Bristol merchant, Thomas Wilde (or Wyld) in 1635. Paper was still being manufactured in 1746 and 1860, but by 1887 it was listed as a corn mill. The track along the valley from Long Dean to the A420 has two strong bridges and paved sections, which suggest it was the common route for transporting the paper to the Bristol Road. The mill was destroyed by fire in the 19th century caused, as local legend would have it, by a boiler exploding, hurling its tenderer, a young lad, across the Bybrook into Chapel Wood. The well for the water wheel remains, as does part of a hatchway in what was the passageway underneath the drying house. Through this hatchway, the local doctor from Castle Combe dispensed medicine to his Long Dean patients in the second half of the 19th century. Straddling the millstream downstream from the mill is a unique stone built privy with seating for two adults and one child at once.

Ford Mill in 1725 was a fulling mill, gig mill, and grist mill, with racks, a furnace, presses and workhouses. In 1778, when it was rebuilt, it was a grist mill. by 1784 it was large enough for a paper mill to be added.

Doncombe Mill. Paying a tithe of 4s in 1704, the mill was probably a fulling mill by then, and earlier could have been a fulling mill. In 1778, with the local industry in decline, owner Benjamin Edwards overstretched himself by building six new tenements (still existing as the stable block, Doncobe Mill Cottage) adjoining his fulling and gig mill. He became bankrupt and in 1793 Charles Ward was the owner, and soon the partnership of Cottle and Ward were making paper. In 1847, the mill became a corn mill. The water in Doncombe Brook is less reliable than the Bybrook, and the mill needed a reservoir covering two thirds of an acre to regulate the supply. This survives as a pond behind the mill house.

Rag Mill in Slaughterford, also known as Overshot Mill. A mill leat, now filled in, ran for over three quarters of a kilometre from the sluices just downstream of the Doncombe Brook confluence to an overshot wheel in a fulling mill on this site. In the 1890s, rag processing machinery was installed at the mill, and the undershot wheel, which can still be seen on the derelict site dates from that time, being served by a much shorter leat from the next sluice upstream from the mill. Also clearly identifiable on the site is the remains of a rag boiler. The mill, demolished in 1964, processed rags into individual fibres or "stuff", which was transported in vats of elm across the bridge to Chapps Mill for paper making. The water wheel power was supplemented by a gas engine, and ran shafts and pulleys to a cutting machine and conveyor belt, as well as a grindstone to sharpen the cutting machine blades.

Chapps Mill was a fulling mill until 1790, when Charles Ward of Doncombe Mill took over from the Drewett family, clothiers of Colerne and Batheaston. Charles Ward and partner William Duckett converted the mill to paper. In 1805, Charles Ward was found guilty of producing unstamped paper and the sheriff confiscated all his goods. By 1818, the mill had been converted to cloth and the paper machinery was put up for sale. By 1827 the mill was back to paper making, until it was closed under W J Dowding in 1994. The Bybrook approaching the mill is man made at a high level and wider than the natural brook to provide a reservoir of water.

Weavern Mill. No mill buildings remain adjacent to the now derelict Weavern Farm; only the sluice opening can be seen at the original location. The name Weavern is a corruption of Wavering, by which the meandering Bybrook was known at this location. The mill was originally a fulling mill. In 1728 it was described as a corn mill, and in 1793 as a paper mill. It ceased work in 1834. From this point, the river is commonly known as the Weavern, even though Ordnance Survey maps maintain the name the Bybrook from the river's source to where it meets the River Avon near Bath.

Widdenham Mill was a fulling mill until 1662, and then lay derelict until the 18th century, when it returned to fulling until 1767, during which it was also a nap mill and had its own shearshop. in 1770 it was also dyeing its own cloth. Between 187 and 1866 the mill produced brown, blue and sugar paper.

Drewett's Mill was in working order as recently as 1990. The mill originally operated an overshot wheel driving three grindstones. In recent times, power to operate two stones and a saw has been through a vertical turbine.

Box Mill (also known as Pinchin's Mill) was in 1864 part of the Box Brewery owned by the Pinchins who in that year closed their Northgate Brewery at Pulteny Bridge. In 1867 it was described as a corn mill and malthouse. The mill was bought from Spafax in 1987 by musician Peter Gabriel, and converted into his internationally known Real World recording studios.

Cuttings Mill. Nothing is known of this mill, which was a casualty of the Great Western Railway, ending up under the embankment between Middlehill Tunnel and Box station.

Shockerwick Mills. Two mills are included in a 1270 deed, and one in a 1275 deed, but nothing is known of them, although a weir and sluice arrangement does exist today just south of the road bridge to Shockerwick.

Bathford Mill, also known as Forde Mills, Gamage Mills and Trevarno Mill. Mentioned in the Domesday Book, in the 16th century this was a grist and fulling mill. In 1740, the then miller sent some water from a newly discovered spring to Oxford, where it was judged to contain minerals. The spring was dubbed "Bathford Spa", and the miller sold his estate to Dr William Oliver, creator of the Bath Oliver biscuit and founder of the Rheumatic Hospital. Dr Oliver named the mill Trevarno. In 1768, James Yeeles, a skinner, converted the mill to a leather mill. On his death, his sons converted it to paper making. In 1882 it suffered in that year's major flooding, then in 1884 a great deal of it was destroyed by a boiler explosion. Finally it was completely rebuilt after a fire in 1910. In 1913 it changed from water power to steam power, in use for the next 50 years. Since 1971, behind high security fencing, Portals have produced high quality paper used by financial institutions in Europe.

Geology
The Bybrook is situated roughly in the centre of the River Avon catchment. In recent geological history, the Bybrook was the headwaters of the Avon; drainage to the south, east, and north of its catchment being to the headwaters of the River Thames. Then a major shift along a fault line captured these waters for the River Avon, the sudden increase in water-cut gorges through what is now Bristol and Bath exposing deep springs, including Bath's hot springs. This also caused the Bybrook to run deeper and steeper, creating the valley it now runs through, and leaving it as a minor tributary of the larger river.

Natural history
The Bybrook has significant populations of water crowfoot, native white-clawed crayfish and dippers. The crayfish are under threat from the invasive species American signal crayfish and otters. Miller's thumbs and lampreys also are to be found in the waters. Grey wagtail, kingfisher and reed bunting can also be seen in the river near Box. Just south of Slaughterford the river passes between two Sites of Special Scientific Interest at Colerne Park and Monk's Wood and Honeybrook Farm. These environments contain many rare meadow and aquatic plants including meadowsweet, common meadow-rue, hemlock water-dropwort and golden-saxifrage.

Hydrology
The Environment Agency measures flow rates in the Bybrook at Middlehill, near Box.
Despite its input of runoff from the M4 motorway, the water quality along the whole of its length is A1.

References

Further reading 
 

Rivers of Gloucestershire
Rivers of Wiltshire